"Do You Love Me" is a song by South Korean girl group 2NE1. The single was digitally released on August 7, 2013 and its music video was released the following day.

The song, produced by YG Entertainment's main producer Teddy Park, is said to be very representative of 2NE1's electro-pop style. The song's musical qualities parallel those of 2NE1's most well-known track "I Am the Best", released two years prior.

Promotion
2NE1 appeared on Korean music shows M! Countdown, Music Bank, and Inkigayo to perform the song live. Their live performance of "Do You Love Me" on KBS's Music Bank was their first on the show in three years since its entertainment agency ceased relationships with KBS following a dispute.

Track listing

Charts

Music program awards

Release history

References

External links
 

2013 singles
2NE1 songs
YG Entertainment singles
2013 songs
Korean-language songs
Songs written by Teddy Park